The International Association for Translation and Intercultural Studies (IATIS) is a forum designed to enable scholars from different regional and disciplinary backgrounds to debate issues relating to translation and other forms of intercultural communication.

Founded in August 2004, its President is Juliane House. Mona Baker, Şebnem Susam-Sarajeva and other linguists are also members of its Executive Council. Its secretariat is located in Seoul, South Korea.

See also 

 Area studies
 Cross-cultural studies
 Cultural competence
 Cultural sensitivity
 Cultural studies
 Intercultural communication principles
 Intercultural relations
 Interculturality
 Project Lingua
 Translation

References

External links
IATIS website
IATIS in the UNESCO directory

Translation associations
Area studies
Cultural studies organizations
Organizations established in 2004